San Miguel de la Sierra is in the municipality of Ayutla, Jalisco, Mexico at an elevation of 2091 meters above sea level.

Geography of Jalisco